Great Speckled Bird is a country rock album by Great Speckled Bird, a band formed in 1969 by Canadian musicians Ian and Sylvia Tyson. The other group members at the time of recording were Buddy Cage, on pedal steel guitar, Amos Garrett, on guitar and backup vocals, and N.D. Smart, on drums. Nashville session musicians David Briggs and Norbert Putnam sat in, with Briggs on piano and Putnam on bass guitar. Although founding member Ken Kalmusky is listed in the original liner notes, he had actually departed the group prior to recording.

The album is notable for being the first album to be produced by Todd Rundgren.

Track listing
"Love What You're Doing Child" (Ian Tyson) – 3:39
"Calgary" (Ian Tyson, Sylvia Tyson) – 3:03
"Trucker's Cafe" (Ian Tyson) – 3:22
"Long Long Time to Get Old" (Ian Tyson) – 3:07
"Flies in the Bottle" (Ian Tyson) – 3:47
"Bloodshot Beholder" (Ian Tyson) – 2:58
"Crazy Arms" (Chuck Seals, Ralph Mooney) – 2:54
"This Dream" (Ian Tyson) – 3:40
"Smiling Wine" (Sylvia Tyson) – 3:11
"Rio Grande" (Ian Tyson, Amos Garrett) – 3:51
"Disappearing Woman" (Sylvia Tyson) – 2:10
"We Sail" (Sylvia Tyson) – 4:37

Personnel
Ian Tyson - guitar, lead vocals
Sylvia Tyson - lead vocals
Buddy Cage - pedal steel guitar
Amos Garrett - guitar, backing vocals
N.D. Smart - drums
David Briggs - piano
Norbert Putnam - bass guitar

Production
Producer: Todd Rundgren
Recording Engineer: Charlie Tallent
Art Direction: Bob Cato
Liner notes: Peter North
Liner notes - 2006 reissue: Richie Unterberger

Citations

References
J. Einarson, I. Tyson, S. Tyson. Four Strong Winds: Ian and Sylvia. 2011. McClelland & Stewart Ltd. . retrieved 2011-09-13.

Ian & Sylvia albums
1969 albums
Albums produced by Todd Rundgren
Ampex Records albums